The Type 73 Medium Truck is an all-terrain four-wheel drive (4x4) truck of the Japan Ground Self-Defense Force known as the 1 1/2 Ton Truck.

History

This truck replaced various  types of previous light and medium trucks in service with the Japan Ground Self-Defense Force. Among them was the 3/4 ton truck manufactured by Toyota and Nissan, which had been in service since the 1950s. One of the reasons the 3/4 ton truck became obsolete, was due to the high fuel consumption of the gasoline engine. Japanese  truck manufacturers were instructed to develop a successor. After competitive bidding Toyota and Hino Motors were selected to develop and build the Type 73 Medium Truck.

Usage
The truck is not armored and thus not made for combat, but with the aim of mainly carrying personnel and transporting goods with a load capacity of 2,000 kg. It is used in various roles. The cab, which has space for the driver and one or two crew is normally fitted with a soft top and windshield which can be folded down in order to lower the silhouette . It is fitted with an all-steel cargo area, which can be covered by a heavy tarpaulin. It is equipped with two wooden personnel benches for transporting up to 16 troops. A step is integrated into the folding tailgate to assist personnel mounting the cargo area. The truck can be used to carry mortars and their crews. The infantry heavy mortar company uses it equipped with a M2 107mm mortar. Additionally you will often find the vehicle with a box type design, such as for radio communications or as an ambulance.

First Generation
The first generation, produced from around 1973 to the mid-1990s, is equipped with a five-speed manual transmission, lacks power steering and bears serial numbers 0001 ~ 39XX. The truck adopted components from the civilian Hino Ranger series: A ladder-type frame,  a four-wheel rigid leaf suspension, a combination of chassis configurations and the part-time four-wheel drive.
It has the following capabilities for off-road use:
 Gradient  60%
 Side slope  30%
 Vertical step  0.5 m
 Trench  0.5 m
 Fording  0.8 m

Second Generation

The second generation, which replaced the first generation in the mid-1990s, is equipped with a four-speed automatic transmission, power steering and bears serial numbers 39XX ~ 5XXX. The following additional changes were made compared to the first generation: switch to the chassis of the Toyota High Mobility Vehicle. It has full-time four wheel drive with a center differential, and the cab is equipped with air conditioning and radio.
In comparison to the first generation, the front bumper shape was changed and the shape of the tail light as well as the style of the round front lights, to make the Toyota truck look similar to the High Mobility Vehicle. It uses the same wheels and tires as the High Mobility Vehicle.  One of the identifying marks is the cutout for the back wheels. Compared to the High Mobility Vehicle the wheelbase has been shortened with good maneuverability for the cab-over shape. It does not feature four wheel steering. In addition, the radiator was lowered and the position and shape of the front radiator cover has been changed.

Gallery

See also
 Mitsubishi Type 73 Light Truck
 Toyota High Mobility Vehicle

References

External links

 Type 73 Chugata

Japan Self-Defense Forces
Cold War military equipment of Japan
All-wheel-drive vehicles
Military trucks
Type 73 Medium Truck
Military vehicles of Japan
Cab over off-road vehicles